Kirk Brandon's 10:51 is the band formed during a visit by Kirk Brandon to Stan Stammers in Philadelphia, Pennsylvania, whilst Spear of Destiny was on hiatus. Stone in the Rain is the band's only album to date, released by Anagram Records in 1995. The album was released by Dojo Records in the United States as Retribution under the Theatre of Hate banner.

Discography

Studio albums
Stone in the Rain
Retribution

Personnel
Kirk Brandon - vocals, guitar
Stan Stammers - bass guitar
John McNutt - guitar
Art Smith - drums
Derek Forbes - bass guitar on "I Can See"

See also
Dead Men Walking

References
Stone in the Rain - Anagram Records CD GRAM 92 (1995)
Retribution - Dojo 3042 2 CD (1996)

External links
KIRKBRANDON.COM (official web site)
STANSTAMMERS.COM (official web site)

English rock music groups